Brian Blankenship (born April 7, 1963) is a former professional American football player who spent his entire career with the Pittsburgh Steelers of the National Football League (NFL).

Career
Blankenship played guard for five seasons for the Pittsburgh Steelers.

Upon joining the Steelers in 1987, Blankenship was in line to assume the role of successor to long-time Steelers center Mike Webster. Blankenship, who had played beside Webster, compared the experience of playing beside Webster like "going back to school" and "like having your big brother there in a fight".

In week thirteen of the 1987 season, Blankenship and fellow guard John Rienstra were playing on special teams when they were lined up against newly drafted Seattle Seahawks linebacker Brian Bozworth. Bozworth, at the time was famous for his flamboyant attitude and rat-tail hairstyle, was double-teamed on a first-quarter kickoff by both Blankenship and Rienstra when Blankenship reached behind Bozworth's helmet and ripped the tail from Bozworth's head and took it to the Steelers' sideline as a "trophy". When asked if he kept the trophy, Blankenship responded "I threw it away with all the other trash. It was Bosworth’s, it ain’t worth nothing." The estimated two-foot tail was compared to "a Neo-Nazi thing...made of twine". Blankenship then compared Bozworth's rat-tail as an item used to distract from his lack of talent, something that followed him since college.

A neck injury in the fourth week of the 1991 NFL season against the New England Patriots forced Blankenship to miss the remaining 13 games of the season. Blankenship had actually verbally agreed to a new contract a day earlier, but never signed the paperwork. After informing Steelers President Dan Rooney of his injury, Rooney wished him well, thanked him for his service, and allowed Blankenship to go "across the hall to get taken care of."

References

1963 births
Living people
American football offensive guards
Sportspeople from Omaha, Nebraska
Pittsburgh Steelers players
Nebraska Cornhuskers football players
People from Bellevue, Nebraska
People from Sarpy County, Nebraska